The Pulitzer Prize for History, administered by Columbia University, is one of the seven American Pulitzer Prizes that are annually awarded for Letters, Drama, and Music. It has been presented since 1917 for a distinguished book about the history of the United States. Thus it is one of the original Pulitzers, for the program was inaugurated in 1917 with seven prizes, four of which were awarded that year. The Pulitzer Prize program has also recognized some historical work with its Biography prize, from 1917, and its General Non-Fiction prize, from 1962.

Finalists have been announced from 1980, ordinarily two others beside the winner.

Winners
In its first 97 years to 2013, the History Pulitzer was awarded 95 times. Two prizes were given in 1989; none in 1919, 1984, and 1994. Four people have won two each, Margaret Leech, Bernard Bailyn, Paul Horgan and Alan Taylor. 

 1917: With Americans of Past and Present Days by Jean Jules Jusserand
 1918: A History of the Civil War, 1861-1865 by James Ford Rhodes
 1919: no award given

1920s
 1920: The War with Mexico by Justin H. Smith
 1921: The Victory at Sea by William Sowden Sims and Burton J. Hendrick
 1922: The Founding of New England by James Truslow Adams
 1923: The Supreme Court in United States History by Charles Warren
 1924: The American Revolution: A Constitutional Interpretation by Charles Howard McIlwain
 1925: History of the American Frontier by Frederic L. Paxson
 1926: A History of the United States, Vol. VI: The War for Southern Independence (1849–1865) by Edward Channing
 1927: Pinckney's Treaty  by Samuel Flagg Bemis
 1928: Main Currents in American Thought  by Vernon Louis Parrington
 1929: The Organization and Administration of the Union Army, 1861–1865 by Fred Albert Shannon

1930s
 1930: The War of Independence by Claude H. Van Tyne
 1931: The Coming of the War, 1914 by Bernadotte E. Schmitt
 1932: My Experiences in the World War by John J. Pershing
 1933: The Significance of Sections in American History by Frederick J. Turner
 1934: The People's Choice by Herbert Agar
 1935: The Colonial Period of American History by Charles McLean Andrews
 1936: A Constitutional History of the United States by Andrew C. McLaughlin
 1937: The Flowering of New England, 1815–1865 by Van Wyck Brooks
 1938: The Road to Reunion, 1865–1900 by Paul Herman Buck
 1939: A History of American Magazines by Frank Luther Mott

1940s
 1940: Abraham Lincoln: The War Years by Carl Sandburg
 1941: The Atlantic Migration, 1607–1860 by Marcus Lee Hansen
 1942: Reveille in Washington, 1860–1865 by Margaret Leech
 1943: Paul Revere and the World He Lived In by Esther Forbes
 1944: The Growth of American Thought by Merle Curti
 1945: Unfinished Business by Stephen Bonsal
 1946: The Age of Jackson by Arthur M. Schlesinger, Jr.
 1947: Scientists Against Time by James Phinney Baxter III
 1948: Across the Wide Missouri by Bernard DeVoto
 1949: The Disruption of American Democracy by Roy Franklin Nichols

1950s
 1950: Art and Life in America by Oliver W. Larkin
 1951: The Old Northwest, Pioneer Period 1815–1840 by R. Carlyle Buley
 1952: The Uprooted by Oscar Handlin
 1953: The Era of Good Feelings by George Dangerfield
 1954: A Stillness at Appomattox by Bruce Catton
 1955: Great River: The Rio Grande in North American History by Paul Horgan
 1956: The Age of Reform by Richard Hofstadter
 1957: Russia Leaves the War: Soviet-American Relations, 1917–1920 by George F. Kennan
 1958: Banks and Politics in America by Bray Hammond
 1959: The Republican Era: 1869–1901 by Leonard D. White and Jean Schneider

1960s
 1960: In the Days of McKinley by Margaret Leech
 1961: Between War and Peace: The Potsdam Conference by Herbert Feis
 1962: The Triumphant Empire: Thunder-Clouds Gather in the West, 1763–1766 by Lawrence H. Gipson
 1963: Washington, Village and Capital, 1800–1878 by Constance McLaughlin Green
 1964: Puritan Village: The Formation of a New England Town by Sumner Chilton Powell
 1965: The Greenback Era by Irwin Unger
 1966: The Life of the Mind in America by Perry Miller
 1967: Exploration and Empire: The Explorer and the Scientist in the Winning of the American West by William H. Goetzmann
 1968: The Ideological Origins of the American Revolution by Bernard Bailyn
 1969: Origins of the Fifth Amendment by Leonard W. Levy

1970s
 1970: Present at the Creation: My Years in the State Department by Dean Acheson
 1971: Roosevelt: The Soldier Of Freedom  by James MacGregor Burns
 1972: Neither Black nor White by Carl N. Degler
 1973: People of Paradox: An Inquiry Concerning the Origins of American Civilization by Michael Kammen
 1974: The Americans: The Democratic Experience by Daniel J. Boorstin
 1975: Jefferson and His Time by Dumas Malone
 1976: Lamy of Santa Fe by Paul Horgan
 1977: The Impending Crisis, 1848–1861 by David M. Potter (Completed and edited by Don E. Fehrenbacher)
 1978: The Visible Hand: The Managerial Revolution in American Business by Alfred D. Chandler, Jr.
 1979: The Dred Scott Case: Its Significance in American Law and Politics by Don E. Fehrenbacher

1980s
Entries from this point on include the finalists listed after the winner for each year.
 1980: Been in the Storm So Long by Leon F. Litwack
 The Plains Across by John B. Unruh
 The Urban Crucible by Gary B. Nash
 1981: American Education: The National Experience, 1783–1876 by Lawrence A. Cremin
 A Search for Power: The 'Weaker Sex' in Seventeenth Century New England by Lyle Koehler
 Over Here: The First World War and American Society by David M. Kennedy
 1982: Mary Chesnut's Civil War by C. Vann Woodward
 Power and Culture: The Japanese-American War, 1941–1945 by Akira Iriye
 White Supremacy: A Comparative Study in American & South African History by George M. Fredrickson
 1983: The Transformation of Virginia, 1740–1790 by Rhys L. Isaac
 Southern Honor: Ethics & Behavior in the Old South by Bertram Wyatt-Brown
 The Glorious Cause: The American Revolution, 1763–1789 by Robert Middlekauff
 1984: no award given
 1985: Prophets of Regulation by Thomas K. McCraw
 The Crucible of Race by Joel Williamson
 The Great Father: The United States Government and the American Indians by Francis Paul Prucha
 1986: ...the Heavens and the Earth: A Political History of the Space Age by Walter A. McDougall
 Emigrants and Exiles: Ireland and the Irish Exodus to North America by Kerby A. Miller
 Labor of Love, Labor of Sorrow: Black Women, Work and the Family from Slavery to the Present by Jacqueline Jones
 Novus Ordo Seclorum: the Intellectual Origins of the Constitution by Forrest McDonald
 1987: Voyagers to the West: A Passage in the Peopling of America on the Eve of the Revolution by Bernard Bailyn
 Bearing the Cross: Martin Luther King, Jr. and the Southern Christian Leadership Conference by David Garrow
 Eisenhower: At War, 1943–1945 by David Eisenhower
 1988: The Launching of Modern American Science, 1846–1876 by Robert V. Bruce
 The Care of Strangers: The Rise of America's Hospital System by Charles E. Rosenberg
 The Fall of the House of Labor by David Montgomery
 1989: Battle Cry of Freedom: The Civil War Era by James M. McPherson
 1989: Parting the Waters: America in the King Years 1954–1963 by Taylor Branch
 A Bright Shining Lie: John Paul Vann and America in Vietnam by Neil Sheehan
 Reconstruction: America's Unfinished Revolution, 1863–1877 by Eric Foner

1990s
 1990: In Our Image: America's Empire in the Philippines by Stanley Karnow
 American Genesis: A Century of Invention and Technological Enthusiasm 1870–1970 by Thomas P. Hughes
 The Image of the Black in Western Art, Volume IV: From the American Revolution to World War I by Hugh Honour
 1991: A Midwife's Tale by Laurel Thatcher Ulrich
 America in 1857: A Nation on the Brink by Kenneth M. Stampp
 Making a New Deal: Industrial Workers in Chicago, 1919–1939 by Lizabeth Cohen
 The Civil Rights Era: Origins and Development of National Policy by Hugh David Graham
 1992: The Fate of Liberty: Abraham Lincoln and Civil Liberties by Mark E. Neely, Jr.
 A Very Thin Line: The Iran-Contra Affairs by Theodore Draper
 Nature's Metropolis: Chicago and the Great West by William Cronon
 Profits in the Wilderness: Entrepreneurship and the Founding of New England Towns in the Seventeenth Century by John Frederick Martin
 The Middle Ground: Indians, Empires, and Republics in the Great Lakes Region, 1650–1815 by Richard White
 1993: The Radicalism of the American Revolution by Gordon S. Wood
 Lincoln at Gettysburg: The Words That Remade America by Garry Wills
 The Promise of the New South: Life After Reconstruction by Edward L. Ayers
 1994: no award given
 Case Closed: Lee Harvey Oswald and the Assassination of JFK by Gerald Posner
 Crime and Punishment in American History by Lawrence M. Friedman
 William Faulkner and Southern History by Joel Williamson
 1995: No Ordinary Time: Franklin and Eleanor Roosevelt: The Home Front in World War II by Doris Kearns Goodwin
 Lincoln in American Memory by Merrill D. Peterson
 Stories of Scottsboro by James Goodman
 1996: William Cooper's Town: Power and Persuasion on the Frontier of the Early American Republic by Alan Taylor
 Dark Sun: The Making of the Hydrogen Bomb by Richard Rhodes
 The Sacred Fire of Liberty: James Madison and the Founding of the Federal Republic by Lance Banning
 1997: Original Meanings: Politics and Ideas in the Making of the Constitution by Jack N. Rakove
 Founding Mothers and Fathers by Mary Beth Norton
 The Battle for Christmas by Stephen Nissenbaum
 1998: Summer for the Gods: The Scopes Trial and America's Continuing Debate Over Science and Religion by Edward J. Larson
 Big Trouble: A Murder in a Small Western Town Sets Off a Struggle for the Soul of America by J. Anthony Lukas
 Civic Ideals: Conflicting Visions of Citizenship in U.S. History by Rogers Smith
 1999: Gotham: A History of New York City to 1898 by Edwin G. Burrows and Mike Wallace
 In a Barren Land: American Indian Dispossession and Survival by Paula Mitchell Marks
 This New Ocean: The Story of the First Space Age by William E. Burrows

2000s
 2000: Freedom From Fear: The American People in Depression and War, 1929–1945 by David M. Kennedy
 The Cousins' Wars: Religion, Politics and the Triumph of Anglo-America by Kevin Phillips
 Into the American Woods: Negotiators on the Pennsylvania Frontier by James H. Merrell
 2001: Founding Brothers: The Revolutionary Generation by Joseph J. Ellis
 The Right to Vote: The Contested History of Democracy in the United States by Alexander Keyssar
 Way Out There in the Blue by Frances FitzGerald
 2002: The Metaphysical Club: A Story of Ideas in America by Louis Menand
 Deep Souths: Delta, Piedmont, and the Sea Island Society in the Age of Segregation by J. William Harris
 Facing East from Indian Country: A Native History of Early America by Daniel K. Richter
 2003: An Army at Dawn: The War in North Africa 1942–1943 by Rick Atkinson
 At the Hands of Persons Unknown: The Lynching of Black America by Philip Dray
 Rereading Sex: Battles Over Sexual Knowledge and Suppression in Nineteenth Century America by Helen Lefkowitz Horowitz
 2004: A Nation Under Our Feet by Steven Hahn
 Great Fortune: The Epic of Rockefeller Center by Daniel Okrent
 They Marched Into Sunlight: War and Peace, Vietnam and America, October 1967 by David Maraniss
 2005: Washington's Crossing by David Hackett Fischer
 Arc of Justice: A Saga of Race, Civil Rights, and Murder in the Jazz Age by Kevin Boyle
 Conjectures of Order: Intellectual Life and the American South, 1810-1860, volumes 1 & 2 by Michael O'Brien
 2006: Polio: An American Story by David Oshinsky
 New York Burning by Jill Lepore
 The Rise of American Democracy: Jefferson to Lincoln by Sean Wilentz
 2007: The Race Beat by Gene Roberts and Hank Klibanoff
 Mayflower: A Story of Courage, Community, and War by Nathaniel Philbrick
 Middle Passages: African American Journeys to Africa, 1787-2005 by James T. Campbell
 2008: What Hath God Wrought: the Transformation of America, 1815–1848 by Daniel Walker Howe
 The Coldest Winter: America and the Korean War by David Halberstam
 Nixon and Kissinger: Partners in Power by Robert Dallek
 2009: The Hemingses of Monticello: An American Family by Annette Gordon-Reed
 The Liberal Hour: Washington and the Politics of Change in the 1960s by G. Calvin Mackenzie and Robert Weisbrot
 This Republic of Suffering: Death and the American Civil War by Drew Gilpin Faust

2010s
 2010: Lords of Finance: The Bankers Who Broke the World by Liaquat Ahamed
 Empire of Liberty: A History of the Early Republic, 1789-1815 by Gordon S. Wood
 Fordlandia: The Rise and Fall of Henry Ford's Forgotten Jungle City by Greg Grandin
 2011: The Fiery Trial: Abraham Lincoln and American Slavery by Eric Foner
 Confederate Reckoning: Power and Politics in the Civil War South by Stephanie McCurry
 Eden on the Charles: The Making of Boston by Michael J. Rawson
 2012: Malcolm X: A Life of Reinvention by Manning Marable
 Empires, Nations & Families: A History of the North American West, 1800-1860 by Anne F. Hyde
 The Eleventh Day: The Full Story of 9/11 and Osama Bin Laden by Anthony Summers and Robbyn Swan
 Railroaded: The Transcontinentals and the Making of Modern America by Richard White
 2013: Embers of War: The Fall of an Empire and the Making of America’s Vietnam by Fredrik Logevall
 The Barbarous Years: The Peopling of British North America: The Conflict of Civilizations, 1600-1675 by Bernard Bailyn
 Lincoln’s Code: The Laws of War in American History by John Fabian Witt
 2014: The Internal Enemy: Slavery and War in Virginia, 1772-1832 by Alan Taylor
 A Dreadful Deceit: The Myth of Race from the Colonial Era to Obama's America by Jacqueline Jones
 Command and Control: Nuclear Weapons, the Damascus Accident and the Illusion of Safety by Eric Schlosser
 2015: Encounters at the Heart of the World: A History of the Mandan People by Elizabeth A. Fenn
 Empire of Cotton: A Global History by Sven Beckert
 An Empire on the Edge: How Britain Came to Fight America by Nick Bunker
 2016: Custer's Trials: A Life on the Frontier of a New America by T. J. Stiles
 Marching Home: Union Veterans and Their Unending Civil War by Brian Matthew Jordan
 Target Tokyo: Jimmy Doolittle and the Raid That Avenged Pearl Harbor by James M. Scott
 The Pentagon's Brain: An Uncensored History of DARPA, America's Top-Secret Military Research Agency by Annie Jacobsen
 2017: Blood in the Water: The Attica Prison Uprising of 1971 and Its Legacy by Heather Ann Thompson
 Brothers at Arms: American Independence and the Men of France and Spain Who Saved It by Larrie D. Ferreiro 
 New England Bound: Slavery and Colonization in Early America by Wendy Warren
 2018: The Gulf: The Making of an American Sea by Jack E. Davis
 Fear City: New York’s Fiscal Crisis and the Rise of Austerity Politics by Kim Phillips-Fein
 Hitler in Los Angeles: How Jews Foiled Nazi Plots against Hollywood and America by Steven J. Ross
 2019: Frederick Douglass: Prophet of Freedom by David W. Blight
 American Eden: David Hosack, Botany, and Medicine in the Garden of the Early Republic by Victoria Johnson
 Civilizing Torture: An American Tradition by W. Fitzhugh Brundage

2020s
2020: Sweet Taste of Liberty: A True Story of Slavery and Restitution in America by W. Caleb McDaniel
Race for Profit: How Banks and the Real Estate Industry Undermined Black Homeownership by Keeanga-Yamahtta Taylor
The End of the Myth: From the Frontier to the Border Wall in the Mind of America by Greg Grandin

2021: Franchise: The Golden Arches in Black America by Marcia Chatelain
The Deviant’s War: The Homosexual vs. the United States of America by Eric Cervini
The Three-Cornered War: The Union, the Confederacy, and Native Peoples in the Fight for the West by Megan Kate Nelson

2022: Two winners: Covered with Night: A Story of Murder and Indigenous Justice in Early America by Nicole Eustace, and Cuba: An American History by Ada Ferrer
Until Justice Be Done: America's First Civil Rights Movement, from the Revolution to Reconstruction by Kate Masur

Repeat winners

Five people have won the Pulitzer Prize for History twice. 
 Margaret Leech, 1942 for Reveille in Washington, 1860–1865 and 1960 for In the Days of McKinley 
 Bernard Bailyn, 1968 for The Ideological Origins of the American Revolution and 1987 for Voyagers to the West: A Passage in the Peopling of America on the Eve of the Revolution 
 Paul Horgan, 1955 for Great River: The Rio Grande in North American History and 1976 for Lamy of Santa Fe
 Alan Taylor, 1996 for William Cooper's Town: Power and Persuasion on the Frontier of the Early American Republic and 2014 for The Internal Enemy: Slavery and War in Virginia, 1772-1832
 Don E. Fehrenbacher completed The Impending Crisis by David Potter, for which Potter posthumously won the 1977 prize, and won the 1979 prize himself for The Dred Scott Case: Its Significance in American Law and Politics.

See also

 List of history awards

References

External links

 

History
History awards
Historiography
Awards established in 1917
 
 
1917 establishments in New York City
American history awards